Yahoo! Go was a Java-based phone application provided by Yahoo! for users to access the company's products and services via their mobile phones or PDAs. Up till its closure, Yahoo! considered Go as Beta software.

Services include sending/receiving email, the upload of photos, using Earth mapping services, search via Yahoo!'s oneSearch and Yahoo! Answers service, checking stock quotes, or obtaining breaking news.

Yahoo! announced in late December 2009 that Yahoo! Go along with technical support for it would be discontinued on January 12, 2010. As of January 22, 2010, Yahoo! Go no longer works.

Others
 Flickr
 News
 Weather
 Finance
 Sports
 Entertainment
 Widget Gallery

References

External links
 Yahoo! Mobile

Mobile software
Pocket PC software
Windows Mobile Standard software
Go